Matiota Kairo was a member of the Kiribati House of Assembly for the constituency of Tamana, until he resigned in 2018.

References

Year of birth missing (living people)
Members of the House of Assembly (Kiribati)
Pillars of Truth politicians
People from the Gilbert Islands